The 2017 season of the Shpageeza Cricket League, also known as SCL 5, was the fifth edition of the Shpageeza, a professional Twenty20 cricket league established by the Afghanistan Cricket Board (ACB) in 2013. The tournament featured the six teams that played in the previous season. The 2017 season was reported to be played from 18 to 28 July 2017, but took place in September 2017, with the Kabul International Cricket Ground hosting all the matches.

The player auction took place in May 2017. Overseas players sold during the auction included Umar Akmal, Sohail Tanvir, Kamran Akmal, Rumman Raees, Sohail Khan, Mohammad Nawaz and Mohammad Rizwan (Pakistan), Tamim Iqbal, Imrul Kayes and Sabbir Rahman (Bangladesh), Sikandar Raza, Solomon Mire, Sean Williams and Hamilton Masakadza (Zimbabwe) and Rayad Emrit (West Indies). However, following a breakdown in relations between the Afghanistan Cricket Board (ACB) and the Pakistan Cricket Board (PCB), the PCB banned its players from taking part. The Bangladesh players also withdrew. As a result of this, and the tournament moving from July to September, overseas players were redrafted. Shortly before the tournament, Sean Williams decided not to travel to join up with Spin Ghar Tigers in order to work on his fitness.

On 13 September 2017, during the match between Boost Defenders and Mis Ainak Knights, a suicide bomber detonated explosives at a checkpoint near the road leading to the stadium, killing three people. The match was briefly halted, but soon resumed. Following the blast, the South African and Zimbabwean cricket boards ordered their representatives to return home. However, most of the Zimbabwean players opted to remain and continue with the tournament, as did the majority of other overseas players, coaches, and commentators such as Dean Jones who expressed his solidarity with the people of Afghanistan. This was the first edition of the tournament since the ICC granted it official Twenty20 status (originally it was given List A cricket status before the 50-over Ghazi Amanullah Khan Regional One Day Tournament was also recognised).

Teams auction 
For the first time in the history of the tournament, since its introduction in 2013 edition of Shpageeza Cricket League, the six teams are now franchise based team and are sold/owned for 3 years, by the winning bid franchises.

 Band-e-Amir Dragons is sold for US$150,000 to the Paragon Group, a logistics and supply services company.
 Spin Ghar Tigers is sold to Muslimyar Group for US$69,000.
 Kabul Eagles is sold for US$89,000 to General Petroleum.
 Amo Sharks is sold to Al-Masafi Group for US$110,000.
 Mis Ainak Knights is sold for US$90,000 to Wazirzai Group.
 Boost Defenders is sold for US$80,000 to Arif Azim Group.

Squads

After the squads were announced, Band-e-Amir Dragons added Tendai Chatara (Zimbabwe) and Ashan Priyanjan (Sri Lanka), while Boost Defenders added Abdul Razak (South Africa) and Johnathan Campbell (Zimbabwe) to their squads as overseas players.

Round-robin

Points table

Fixtures

Knockout-stage

References

External links 
 Shpageeza Cricket League 2017
 Series home on ESPN Cricinfo

Shpageeza Cricket League
Shpageeza Cricket League